Donald A. Rossi (June 2, 1918 – March 11, 1990) was the founding general manager of the Dallas Texans (now the Kansas City Chiefs) and was later president of the National Golf Foundation and the executive director of the Golf Course Builders Association of America.

Rossi was a quarterback at Michigan State University in the 1938 and 1939 seasons.  He also boxed at the school.

He was a National Football League official when he became the Texans first general manager under Lamar Hunt.  After the Texans were 3–4 in their inaugural season under Rossi, he was fired on November 1, 1960 and was replaced by longtime Hunt assistant Jack Steadman.  The Chiefs were 5–2 under Steadman completing the first season at 8–6 and having an average attendance of 24,500 (the highest of any team in the first season of the newly created American Football League.  Rossi's most lasting contribution to the team was the hiring of University of Miami coach Hank Stram.

Rossi was president of the National Golf Foundation from 1970 to 1983 and then was executive director of the National Association of Public Golf Courses (now the National Golf Course Owners Association) from its founding as a NGF spin off in 1984 until 1990.  The Golf Builders Association of America now gives the Don A. Rossi Award to "honor individuals who have made significant contributions to the game of golf and its growth, and who have inspired others."

Recipients of the Don Rossi Award granted by the National Golf Course Owner's Association, given for significant and long-lasting contribution to the NGCOA have been:

2020 Rock Lucas
2019 Kathy Aznavorian
2018 Peter Hill
2017 Linda Rogers
2016 Bill Aragona
2015 Anne Lyndrup
2014 Mike Hughes
2013 Jim Hinckley
2012 Jeff Hoag
2011 Dan Clark
2010 Meriam Leeke
2009 Henry DeLozier
2008 Larry Giustina
2007 Marcel Welling
2006 Walter Lankau, Jr.
2005 Bill Stine
2004 NGCOA Founding Members
2003 Clay Brittain
2002 Jerry Hollingsworth
2001 Mark Seabrook
2000 Curt Walker
1999 Michael Muetzel
1998 The Scott Family
1997 Peter Trenchard
1996 Vince Alfonso, Jr.
1995 Cecil McKay
1994 Fred Tingle
1993 Gibson Lunt
1992 Scott Krause
1991 Bailey Trull

References

1918 births
1990 deaths
American football quarterbacks
Dallas Texans (AFL) executives
Michigan State Spartans football players